Albertha Frances Anne Spencer-Churchill, Duchess of Marlborough, VA (29 July 1847 – 7 January 1932) was an English aristocrat.

Early life 
She was born the sixth daughter and tenth child of James Hamilton, 1st Duke of Abercorn, and Lady Louisa Russell. As a young woman, aged 18, Lady Albertha Hamilton was one of eight train bearers at the wedding of The Princess Helena and Prince Christian of Schleswig-Holstein on 5 July 1866 at Windsor Castle, Windsor, Berkshire, England.

Marriage and issue 
On 8 November 1869, Albertha married George Spencer-Churchill, Marquess of Blandford, eldest son of John Spencer-Churchill, 7th Duke of Marlborough. This was in defiance of the wishes of George's dominating mother, Frances Anne Spencer-Churchill, Duchess of Marlborough, who disliked Albertha and described her as "stupid, pious and dull". The wedding was held at Westminster Palace. They had four children:
 Lady Frances Louisa Spencer-Churchill (15 September 1870 – 13 November 1954), married 6 June 1893 Sir Robert Gresley, 11th Baronet, by whom she had issue.
 Charles Richard John Spencer-Churchill, 9th Duke of Marlborough (13 November 1871 – 30 June 1934).
Lady Lillian Maud Spencer-Churchill (9 July 1873 – 4 January 1951), married 6 October 1898 Colonel Cecil Grenfell, she had no issue.
 Lady Norah Beatrice Henriette Spencer-Churchill (1 September 1875 – 28 April 1946), married 1 December 1920 Francis Bradley Bradley-Birt, she had no issue.

On 20 November 1883, shortly after Blandford inherited the dukedom following the death of his father, the couple were divorced. Afterwards, though still entitled to be addressed as Albertha, Duchess of Marlborough, she preferred to use the title she had used throughout most of the couple's married life and was known as Albertha, Marchioness of Blandford.

Ancestry

References

1847 births
1932 deaths
Daughters of British dukes
Albertha Spencer-Churchill, Duchess of Marlborough
English duchesses by marriage
Ladies of the Royal Order of Victoria and Albert